The 2015 World Minifootball Federation World Cup is the first edition of the WMF World Cup held by the World Minifootball Federation. The tournament was contested in nine cities across the United States from 21–29 March 2015.

Venues
Host cities include Allen, TX (suburban Dallas); Park City, KS; Ontario, CA; Rochester, NY; Taylor, MI; Flint, MI; San Diego, CA; Tulsa, OK; and Chicago, IL.

Teams

 USA (Host Nation)

Group stage
The fixture schedule was announced on 21 February 2015.

The first round, or group stage, saw the twelve teams divided into three groups of four teams. Each group was a round-robin of six games, where each team played one match against each of the other teams in the same group. The teams finishing first, second and two best-placed third teams in each group qualified for the Quarter-finals.

All times listed are local.

Group A

Group B

Group C

Ranking of third placed teams

Knockout stage
In the knockout stage, the eight teams play a single-elimination tournament.

Quarterfinals

Semifinals

Final

Winner

Awards

References

External links
WMF World Cup official website 
World Minifooball Federation official website

2015
International association football competitions hosted by the United States
2015 in American soccer
March 2015 sports events in the United States